The Roman Catholic Diocese of Kohima is a diocese headquartered in the city of Kohima, Nagaland, in the ecclesiastical province of Imphal in India. Its territory includes the entire state of Nagaland.

History
 29 January 1973: Established as Diocese of Kohima–Imphal from the Diocese of Dibrugarh
 28 March 1980: Erected as Diocese of Kohima through the division of the Diocese of Kohima–Imphal

Leadership
 Bishops of Kohima (Latin Rite)
 Bishop James Thoppil (16 June 2011 – present)
 Bishop Jose Mukala (24 October 1997 – 30 October 2009)
 Bishop Abraham Alangimattathil, S.D.B. (28 March 1980 – 11 July 1996)
 Bishops of Kohima–Imphal (Latin Rite) 
 Bishop Abraham Alangimattathil, S.D.B. (29 January 1973 – 28 March 1980)

References

External links
 GCatholic.org 
 Catholic Hierarchy 

Roman Catholic dioceses in India
Christian organizations established in 1973
Roman Catholic dioceses and prelatures established in the 20th century
Christianity in Nagaland
1973 establishments in Nagaland
Kohima